Berbiguières is a commune in the southwestern French department of Dordogne.
In Occitan, the town is called Berbiguièras.

Population

See also
Communes of the Dordogne department

References

Communes of Dordogne